Les Patterson Saves the World is a 1987 Australian comedy film starring Barry Humphries as his stage creations Sir Les Patterson and Dame Edna Everage.

Plot
The uncouth Sir Les Patterson teams up with Dame Edna Everage (both played by Barry Humphries) to save the world from a virulent bioterror attack ordered by Colonel Richard Godowni (Thaao Penghlis) of the Gulf State of Abu Niveah.

Cast
Barry Humphries as Sir Les Patterson / Dame Edna Everage
Pamela Stephenson as Veronique Crudité
Thaao Penghlis as Colonel Richard Godowni
Andrew Clarke as Neville Thonge
Henri Szeps as Dr. Charles Herpes / Desiree Herpes
Hugh Keays-Byrne as Inspector Farouk
Elizabeth McIvor as Nancy Borovansky
Garth Meade as Mustafa Toul
Arthur Sherman as General Evans 
John Clarke as Mike Rooke 
Josef Drewniak as Mossolov
Esben Storm as Russian Scientist
Joy Westmore as Lady Gwen Patterson
Connie Hobbs as Madge Allsop
Joan Rivers as the U.S. President

Production
The film was co-written by Humphries with his third wife Diane Millstead, and directed by George Miller of The Man from Snowy River fame.

The film was originally meant to be made by Thorn EMI in Britain but was eventually established in Australia with entirely Australian money.

Filming began 18 August 1986.

Box office
Les Patterson Saves the World grossed $626,000 at the box office in Australia. "It was a disaster of major proportions," said Jonathan Chissick of Hoyts, who distributed the film in Australia. David Stratton wrote in 1990, "The gala opening was an embarrassing occasion, and it is still rumoured in the industry today that the Federal Treasurer Paul Keating, who attended, was so angry that he decide to end rorts in the film industry."

The movie was released to British cinemas in 1988 but was not successful there either.

Critical reception
Australian film critic Michael Adams later included Les Patterson Saves the World on his list of the worst ever Australian films, along with Phantom Gold, The Glenrowan Affair, Houseboat Horror, Welcome to Woop Woop, The Pirate Movie and Pandemonium.

See also
 Cinema of Australia

References

External links
Les Patterson Saves The World at the National Film and Sound Archive

Les Patterson Saves the World at Oz Movies
Review at the Guardian
Les Patterson Saves the World at BFI
Les Patterson Saves the World at Screen Australia
Les Patterson Saves the World at Letterbox DVD

1987 films
1987 comedy films
Australian comedy films
Films directed by George T. Miller
Barry Humphries
1980s English-language films